George Leicester or Leycester may also refer to:

George Leicester, 2nd Baron de Tabley
George Leycester, cricketer
George Leycester (MP) for Thirsk (UK Parliament constituency)